No Tomorrow (Korean: 섬. 사라진 사람들; RR: Seom. Sarajin Saramdeul) is a 2016 South Korean film starring Park Hyo-joo and Lee Hyun-wook. The story is loosely based on the 2014 Salt Farm Slavery Incident in the island county of Sinan in South Jeolla Province, in which disabled men were sold as laborers, forced to work without pay, and beaten if they didn’t work hard enough; other islanders were complicit in helping the slavers find victims who tried to escape. The real-life investigation was spurred by a letter from one of the victims. In the film, an independent investigator and a cameraman try to unravel the mystery after receiving a tip from an informant. A quote from Bernard Shaw appears in the closing credits: "The worst sin towards our fellow creatures is not to hate them, but to be indifferent to them."

Plot 
An informant contacts journalist Lee Hye-ri (Park) to report that laborers at a salt farm, who have cognitive disabilities, have actually been enslaved. She and cameraman Jo Suk-hoon (Lee) disguise themselves as documentary filmmakers who are interested in salt harvesting and go to the island where the farm is located. They question the local residents but find them secretive and distrustful. As the pair continues to ask questions, a violent attack occurs in which four people end up dead; the salt farm owner (Choi Il-hwa) and his son (Ryu) go missing along with one worker, while Hye-ri is severely injured and ends up in a coma. Detective Choi (Choi Gwi-hwa) and an investigative police officer (Bae Yu-ram) pick up the case.

Cast 

 Park Hyo-joo as Lee Hye-ri
 Bae Sung-woo as Sang-ho
 Lee Hyun-wook as Jo Suk-hoon
 Ryu Jun-yeol as Ji-hoon
 Choi Il-hwa as Sung-goo
 Choi Gwi-hwa as Detective Choi
 Keum Dong-hyun as Hyoo-joong
 Lee Sung-wook as Jae-hee
 Bae Yu-ram as the police officer
 Son Young-soon as the grandmother

Release & Reception 
No Tomorrow was released on March 30, 2016 at 206 theaters around South Korea. It grossed $106,019 at the South Korea box office.

References

External links
 
 
 

2016 films
South Korean drama films
2010s Korean-language films
2010s South Korean films